Bertha Louise Townsend Toulmin (née Townsend; March 7, 1869 – May 12, 1909) was a female tennis player from the United States. She is best remembered for being the first repeating women's singles champion at the U.S. Championships (now: U.S. Open) (1888 and 1889). She discovered the under-hand technique.

She was inducted into the International Tennis Hall of Fame in 1974.

Grand Slam finals

Singles (2 titles, 1 runner-up)

Doubles (1 title, 1 runners-up)

References

External links
 

American female tennis players
International Tennis Hall of Fame inductees
Tennis players from Philadelphia
United States National champions (tennis)
1869 births
1909 deaths
Grand Slam (tennis) champions in women's singles
Grand Slam (tennis) champions in women's doubles